The Castrol performance index is a ranking system created by Castrol for men's club association football as part of a sponsorship package with FIFA. The system uses mathematical formulas which evaluate various player performance in terms of how individual actions either assist or prevent goals. The system takes into account the strength of the opposition and the time in a game the player's actions occurred.

Castrol publishes several rankings: players in top five European leagues monthly during a season, MLS player ranking and international tournament rankings. Castrol became the official oil lubricant of FIFA in 2008. It published a ranking in UEFA Euro 2008. It was an official sponsor the 2010 FIFA World Cup in South Africa and an index measuring World Cup player performance was updated after each round of matches. Castrol made a ranking in Euro 2012 and the 2013 FIFA Confederations Cup.

Castrol index ranking
The Castrol Index is a rolling ranking system that measures performance of every football player across Europe's top five leagues during the course of a 12-month period. Rankings are published monthly.

To get Castrol Index Ranking, first "Castrol Index Score" is calculated for every player in every league and Champions league match, then the score weighted to get "Castrol Ranking points", and lastly, cumulative points from every match during the 12-month period are multiplied with 90 and divided by total minutes played.

Weightings are different in every league and are adjusted after every season by strength of every league. For example, Champions league knock-out stage has biggest weight.

Top-rated players 
Since the beginning of the ranking, September 2009, there have been three players in the top position.

EDGE Performance of the Month 
Castrol awards every month an "EDGE Performance of the Month" title for a player who gets most performance points in a match during the month. Also, after every season, the top performing player (the top player in the ranking at the end of the season) is announced.

UEFA Euro 2008 
Xavi was awarded with the Castrol Player of the Tournament trophy in UEFA Euro 2008. He was selected by UEFA Technical Team taking into account public votes of the top ten of Castrol Performance Index.

2010 FIFA World Cup 
The top 10 players in 2010 FIFA World Cup were selected from players who advanced to round of 16.

Top 11 team with best one goalkeeper, four defenders, four midfielders, and two forwards included also midfielders Mark van Bommel (Netherlands) and Sergio Busquets (Spain) (and excluded Gerard Piqué as he was fifth best defender).

UEFA Euro 2012 
The ranking was first used in Euro 2008 qualifications and the main tournament, as well as in Euro 2012. Castrol predicted Spain and Netherlands to play in the final and Spain to win it. The top 10 players were:

2013 FIFA Confederations Cup 
The top 10 was:

Castrol Index Top 11 had 2 forwards, 4 midfielders, 4 defenders and a goalkeeper. In addition to above, best goalkeeper was Júlio César (Brazil), and next two best midfielders were Daniele De Rossi (Italy) and Paulinho (Brazil). Defenders Marcelo and Piqué were not included.

2014 FIFA World Cup 
The top 10 was: [62]

Toni Kroos was the top player, and the Top 11 was made with a 4–4–2 formation:

References

External links
Castrol Rankings

Association football rankings
Rating systems